William Beaver may refer to:
William H. Beaver (born 1940), accounting researcher and educator
William T. Beaver (1933–2020), American medical researcher and educator